List of festivals in Australia, including any established festival or carnival in Australia.

Australian Capital Territory (including Canberra Region NSW)

New South Wales

Northern Territory

Queensland

South Australia

Tasmania

Victoria

Western Australia

See also

List of festivals
List of festivals in Brisbane
List of Australian music festivals

References

External links
 Australian Festivals Calendar - A calendar of current Australian Festivals with dates and details.
 myFestivals App - Calendar of Australian Festivals
 Our Festivals Australia - Australian Festival Listing